Doña Adela Serra-Ty was a Filipino politician who served as the former Governor of Surigao del Sur, following the Serra politicians before her. She was famous for her generosity and good works. She is responsible for the building of Surigao del Sur's Capitol, the restoration of the church located in the capital, and other infrastructure. Adela Serra-Ty memorial hospital was named after her.

During the time when Doña Adela was governing Surigao del Sur, it was considered as a Class A province which maintained an annual income of about 13,000,000 Philippine Pesos. She was an undefeated figure in the political scene.

Adela Serra-Ty was married to a wealthy Chinese Filipino merchant with whom she had 7 children. She started the Ty political dynasty that would last for decades.

Women provincial governors of the Philippines
Governors of Surigao del Sur
Year of birth missing
Year of death missing